Boyan is a Slavic male given name. The short form of the name Boyan used in Bulgaria is Bobi or Bobby (Bulgarian: Боби). Its female equivalent is Boyana (Bulgarian: Бояна).

In present days it is used as a given name in Bulgaria written as Boyan (Bulgarian: Боян), and also in all countries of former Yugoslavia, mainly written as Bojan (Serbian and Macedonian: Бојан)/(Slovenian/Croatian: Bojan).

The name is recorded in historical sources among the Bulgarians, Serbs, Macedonians, Czechs, Poles.

Etymology 
There is some discussion as to where the name Boyan comes from. It is generally accepted that it is derived from the word бой- (boy-), which means "battle", and the suffix -ан (-an) which is common in Bulgarian and other Slavic names. Together, Boyan (Боян) means "warrior" or "fighter".

It is also considered as a possibility from the Turkic/Mongolic word "Bayan" meaning rich, wealth, of the khagan of Avars Bayan I (562-602), and of the Bulgars  Batbayan (665–668); from the name of Bohemia, the area of modern Czech Republic, in Serbian as Bojka (White Serbia), where lived the Celtic tribe Boii; from the Celtic Bryan or Brian which shares spelling and meaning similarity. Therefore, according to the Celtic origin of the name Bryan or Brian, the Slavic name Boyan or Bojan could have the meaning "strong" or "noble".

Notable Boyans
Batbayan of Bulgaria, also known as Batboyan or simply Boyan. The first son of Bulgarian khan Kubrat.
Boyan-Enravota, the first Bulgarian Christian martyr and the earliest Bulgarian saint
Boyan (bard), Rus' bard from the 10th century
Boyanka Angelova, Bulgarian gymnast
Boyan Chowdhury, former lead guitarist of rock band The Zutons
Boyan Gaytanov, Bulgarian footballer
Boyan Iliev, Bulgarian football player
Boyan Jovanovic, professor of economics at New York University
Boyan Kotsev, Bulgarian cyclist
Boyan Petkanchin, Bulgarian mathematician
Boyan Peykov, Bulgarian footballer
Boyan Radev, Bulgarian wrestler
Boyan Slat (born 1994), Dutch inventor and entrepreneur 
Boyan Tabakov, Bulgarian football player
Boyan Vodenitcharov, Bulgarian pianist and composer
Boyan Yordanov, Bulgarian volleyball player
Boyan Peyakovich, Serbian IT specialist
Boyan Stoynov, Bulgarian IT specialist

Places
Boyana, neighbourhood of the Bulgarian capital of Sofia
Boyana Church, medieval Bulgarian Orthodox church situated in the Boyana neighbourhood	
Boyana Glacier on Livingston Island in the South Shetland Islands, Antarctica, which is named for Boyana neighbourhood.

See also
Bojan
Bryan (given name)
Boyana (given name)
Bulgarian name
Serbian name
Slavic names

References

Bulgarian masculine given names
Czech masculine given names
Polish masculine given names
Slovak masculine given names
Slavic masculine given names
Masculine given names